Enrique Montero Rodríguez (born 28 December 1954 in El Puerto de Santa María, Andalusia) is a Spanish retired footballer who played as a midfielder.

External links
 
 Stats and bio at Cadistas1910 
 
 

1954 births
Living people
People from El Puerto de Santa María
Sportspeople from the Province of Cádiz
Spanish footballers
Footballers from Andalusia
Association football midfielders
La Liga players
Segunda División players
Segunda División B players
Tercera División players
Sevilla FC players
CD San Fernando players
Cádiz CF players
Spain under-23 international footballers
Spain amateur international footballers
Spain B international footballers
Spain international footballers